Satanic Curses is the fifth studio album by the German power metal band Mystic Prophecy.

Track listing

All music by: Liapakis & Pohl
All lyrics by: Liapakis
Song 11 written by: Iommi, Ward, Butler, Osbourne

 "Back from the Dark" - 3:47  
 "Sacrifice Me" - 3:59 
 "Dark Forces" - 3:44
 "Satanic Curses" - 3:40  
 "Evil of Destruction" - 4:27  
 "Demons Blood" - 4:45
 "Damnation" - 4:02
 "Rock the Night" - 4:13
 "We Will Survive" - 4:38
 "Grave of Thousand Lies" - 3:47
 "Paranoid" (Black Sabbath cover) - 2:45
 "We Fly" (Bonus track) - 4:21

Credits 
 Roberto Dimitri Liapakis   -  vocals
 Martin Grimm   -  guitars
 Markus Pohl    -  guitars
 Martin Albrecht - Bass
 Mattias Straub  - drums

2007 albums
Mystic Prophecy albums
Massacre Records albums